Copera is a genus of damselflies in the family Platycnemididae. They are distributed in Asia, especially Southeast Asia.

There are approximately 9 species in the genus. Genetic analysis suggests that some members, such as Copera ciliata, are better treated as species in the genus Platycnemis.

Species include:

Copera annulata
Copera atomaria	
Copera chantaburii
Copera ciliata	
Copera imbricata
Copera marginipes – yellow bush dart
Copera rubripes
Copera superplatypes
Copera tokyoensis
Copera vittata – blue bush dart

References

Platycnemididae
Zygoptera genera
Taxa named by William Forsell Kirby